The stout-legged finch (Ciridops tenax) is an extinct species of finch, in the 'Hawaiian honeycreeper' group. Subfossil remains have been found only on the island of Kauai and indicate that it survived up until the late Quaternary period. It probably died out when the first humans arrived in the Hawaiian Islands. The stout-legged finch would have been very vulnerable to the pests and agriculture that the humans brought with them. It was a congener of the 'ula-'ai-hawane, and therefore probably had similar colors of red, white and black.

References

Further reading
H. Douglas Pratt, Jack Jeffrey: The Hawaiian Honeycreepers  Oxford University Press, 2005 
Scott B Wilson & Arthur Humble Evans: Aves Hawaiienses: The Birds of the Sandwich Islands. 1890–99. R. H. Porter, London (Reprint: Ayer Publishing, 1974 )

Late Quaternary prehistoric birds
Holocene extinctions
Ciridops
Extinct birds of Hawaii
Endemic fauna of Hawaii
Hawaiian honeycreepers
Biota of Kauai
Taxa named by Storrs L. Olson
Taxa named by Helen F. James
Fossil taxa described in 1991